Will Kindrick is an American filmmaker, commercial, music video director who has written and directed works for Ice Cube, Brian Wilson, She & Him, Mates of State, Postino among others. He is also known for his work on the Nick Jr series Yo Gabba Gabba!.

Kindrick is a graduate of Art Center College of Design in Pasadena, California. While attending Art Center Will created the award-winning 10 episode comedy web series "Dead Grandma" starring Matt Heder, Beverly Welsh, Shannon Mary Dixon and Jon Heder

References

External links

Art Center College of Design alumni
Year of birth missing (living people)
Living people
American directors